The Milwaukee Brewers' 2012 season was the 43rd season for the franchise in Milwaukee, the 15th in the National League, and 44th overall. The Brewers finished the season with an 83–79 record and third place in the Central Division of the National League. They did not make the playoffs.

The Brewers struck out 10 or more opposing batters in each of eight consecutive games between August 20 and August 28, the longest such streak in MLB history as of 2016.

Regular season

NL Central standings

NL Wild Card

Roster

Game log 

|-  align"center" bgcolor="ffbbbb"
| 1 || April 6 || Cardinals || 5–11 || García (1–0) || Gallardo (0–1) ||  || 46,086 || 0–1
|-  align"center" bgcolor="bbffbb"
| 2 || April 7 || Cardinals || 6–0 || Greinke (1–0) || Wainwright (0–1) || || 42,084 || 1–1
|-  align"center" bgcolor="ffbbbb"
| 3 || April 8 || Cardinals || 3–9 || Lynn (1–0) || Wolf (0–1) || || 33,211 || 1–2
|-  align"center" bgcolor="bbffbb"
| 4 || April 9 || @ Cubs || 7–5 || Marcum (1–0) || Camp (0–1) || Axford (1) || 38,136 || 2–2
|-  align"center" bgcolor="bbffbb"
| 5 || April 10 || @ Cubs || 7–4 || Narveson (1–0) || Maholm (0–1) || Rodríguez (1) || 37,265 || 3–2
|-  align"center" bgcolor="bbffbb"
| 6 || April 11 || @ Cubs || 2–1 || Gallardo (1–1) || Dempster (0–1) || Axford (2) || 34,044 || 4–2
|-  align"center" bgcolor="ffbbbb"
| 7 || April 12 || @ Cubs || 0–8 || Garza (1–0) || Greinke (1–1) || || 36,311 || 4–3
|-  align"center" bgcolor="ffbbbb"
| 8 || April 13 || @ Braves || 8–10 || Venters (1–0) || Rodríguez (0–1) || Kimbrel (3) || 50,635 || 4–4
|-  align"center" bgcolor="ffbbbb"
| 9 || April 14 || @ Braves || 1–2 || Minor (1–1) || Marcum (1–1) || Kimbrel (4) || 37,438 || 4–5
|-  align"center" bgcolor="ffbbbb"
| 10 || April 15 || @ Braves || 4–7 || Beachy (1–1) || Narveson (1–1) || || 30,831 || 4–6
|-  align"center" bgcolor="bbffbb"
| 11 || April 17 || Dodgers || 5–4 || Veras (1–0) || Guerra (1–1) || || 27,159 || 5–6
|-  align"center" bgcolor="bbffbb"
| 12 || April 18 || Dodgers || 3–2 (10) || Loe (1–0) || Guerrier (0–1) || || 30,189 || 6–6
|-  align"center" bgcolor="ffbbbb"
| 13 || April 19 || Dodgers || 3–4 || Harang (1–1) || Wolf (0–2) || Guerra (6) || 30,091 || 6–7
|-  align"center" bgcolor="ffbbbb"
| 14 || April 20 || Rockies || 3–4 || Belisle (1–0) || Axford (0–1) || Betancourt (4) || 39,188 || 6–8
|-  align"center" bgcolor="bbffbb"
| 15 || April 21 || Rockies || 9–4 || Veras (2–0) || Rogers (0–1) || || 43,565 || 7–8
|-  align"center" bgcolor="ffbbbb"
| 16 || April 22 || Rockies || 1–4 || Guthrie (2–1) || Rodríguez (0–2) || Betancourt (5) || 42,611 || 7–9
|-  align"center" bgcolor="bbffbb"
| 17 || April 23 || Astros || 6–5 || Greinke (2–1) || Harrell (1–1) || Axford (3) || 36,291 || 8–9
|-  align"center" bgcolor="bbffbb"
| 18 || April 24 || Astros || 9–6 || Wolf (1–2)|| Norris (1–1) || Axford (4) || 38,686 || 9–9
|-  align"center" bgcolor="ffbbbb"
| 19 || April 25 || Astros || 5–7 || López (2–0) || Veras (2–1) || Myers (3) || 26,778 || 9–10
|-  align"center" bgcolor="ffbbbb"
| 20 || April 27 || @ Cardinals || 1–13 || Westbrook (3–1) || Gallardo (1–2) || || 43,063 || 9–11
|-  align"center" bgcolor="ffbbbb"
| 21 || April 28 || @ Cardinals || 3–7 || Lohse (4–0) || Estrada (0–1) || || 42,586 || 9–12
|-  align"center" bgcolor="bbffbb"
| 22 || April 29 || @ Cardinals || 3–2 || Greinke (3–1) || García (2–1) || Axford (5) || 45,824 || 10–12
|-  align"center" bgcolor="bbffbb"
| 23 || April 30 || @ Padres || 8–3 || Wolf (2–2) || Wieland (0–4) || || 16,218 || 11–12

|-  align"center" bgcolor="ffbbbb"
| 24 || May 1 || @ Padres || 0–2 || Cashner (2–1) || Rodríguez (0–3) || Street (4) || 19,260 || 11–13
|-  align"center" bgcolor="ffbbbb"
| 25 || May 2 || @ Padres || 0–5 || Suppan (1–0) || Gallardo (1–3) || || 15,786 || 11–14
|-  align"center" bgcolor="bbffbb"
| 26 || May 4 || @ Giants || 6–4 || Loe (2–0) || Hensley (1–3) || Axford (6) || 41,082 || 12–14
|-  align"center" bgcolor="ffbbbb"
| 27 || May 5 || @ Giants || 2–5 || Bumgarner (5–1) || Wolf (2–3) || Casilla (5) || 41,135 || 12–15
|-  align"center" bgcolor="ffbbbb"
| 28 || May 6 || @ Giants || 3–4 (11) || López (3–0) || Dillard (0–1) || || 41,796 || 12–16
|-  align"center" bgcolor="ffbbbb"
| 29 || May 7 || Reds || 1–6 || Arroyo (2–1) || Estrada (0–2) || || 27,157 || 12–17
|-  align"center" bgcolor="bbffbb"
| 30 || May 8 || Reds || 8–3 || Gallardo (2–3) || Bailey (1–3) || || 28,108 || 13–17
|-  align"center" bgcolor="ffbbbb"
| 31 || May 9 || Reds || 1–2 || Chapman (3–0) || Axford (0–2) || Ondrusek (1) || 27,090 || 13–18
|-  align"center" bgcolor="bbffbb"
| 32 || May 11 || Cubs || 8–7 (13) || Chulk (1–0) || Castillo (0–1) || || 40,097 || 14–18
|-  align"center" bgcolor="bbffbb"
| 33 || May 12 || Cubs || 8–2 || Marcum (2–1) || Volstad (0–5) || || 42,339 || 15–18
|-  align"center" bgcolor="ffbbbb"
| 34 || May 13 || Cubs || 2–8 || Camp (1–1) || Loe (2–1) || || 42,167 || 15–19
|-  align"center" bgcolor="ffbbbb"
| 35 || May 14 || @ Mets || 1–3 || Batista (1–1) || Gallardo (2–4) || Francisco (9) || 20,061 || 15–20
|-  align"center" bgcolor="bbffbb"
| 36 || May 15 || @ Mets || 8–0 || Greinke (4–1) || Gee (2–3) || || 22,268 || 16–20
|-  align"center" bgcolor="ffbbbb"
| 37 || May 16 || @ Astros || 3–8 || Norris (4–1) || Wolf (2–4) || || 15,453 || 16–21
|-  align"center" bgcolor="ffbbbb"
| 38 || May 17 || @ Astros || 0–4 || Happ (3–3) || Marcum (2–2) || || 15,173 || 16–22
|-  align"center" bgcolor="ffbbbb"
| 39 || May 18 || Twins || 3–11 || Diamond (3–0) || Estrada (0–3) || || 32,421 || 16–23
|-  align"center" bgcolor="ffbbbb"
| 40 || May 19 || Twins || 4–5 (11) || Gray (3–0) || Parra (0–1) || Capps (9) || 42,398 || 16–24
|-  align"center" bgcolor="bbffbb"
| 41 || May 20 || Twins || 16–4 || Greinke (5–1) || Marquis (2–4) || || 33,064 || 17–24
|-  align"center" bgcolor="ffbbbb"
| 42 || May 21 || Giants || 3–4 (14) || Casilla (1–2) || Pérez (0–1) || || 31,644 || 17–25
|-  align"center" bgcolor="ffbbbb"
| 43 || May 22 || Giants || 4–6 || Cain (4–2) || Marcum (2–3) || Casilla (11) || 30,451 || 17–26
|-  align"center" bgcolor="bbffbb"
| 44 || May 23 || Giants || 8–5 || Veras (3–1) || Zito (3–2) || Axford (7) || 37,691 || 18–26
|-  align"center" bgcolor="bbffbb"
| 45 || May 25 || @ Diamondbacks || 7–1 || Gallardo (3–4) || Kennedy (3–5) || || 35,478 || 19–26
|-  align"center" bgcolor="ffbbbb"
| 46 || May 26 || @ Diamondbacks || 5–8 || Miley (6–1) || Greinke (5–2) || Putz (10) || 30,184 || 19–27
|-  align"center" bgcolor="ffbbbb"
| 47 || May 27 || @ Diamondbacks || 3–4 || Shaw (1–2) || Veras (3–2) || Putz (11) || 33,481 || 19–28
|-  align"center" bgcolor="bbffbb"
| 48 || May 28 || @ Dodgers || 3–2 || Marcum (3–3) || Harang (3–3) || Axford (8) || 38,016 || 20–28
|-  align"center" bgcolor="bbffbb"
| 49 || May 29 || @ Dodgers || 2–1 || Fiers (1–0) || Eovaldi (0–1) || Axford (9) || 51,137 || 21–28
|-  align"center" bgcolor="bbffbb"
| 50 || May 30 || @ Dodgers || 6–3 || Gallardo (4–4) || Kershaw (4–3) || Axford (10) || 25,509 || 22–28
|-  align"center" bgcolor="bbffbb"
| 51 || May 31 || @ Dodgers || 6–2 || Greinke (6–2) || Billingsley (2–4) || || 26,773 || 23–28

|-  align"center" bgcolor="ffbbbb"
| 52 || June 1 || Pirates || 2–8 || Correia (2–5) || Wolf (2–5) || || 33,055 || 23–29
|-  align"center" bgcolor="bbffbb"
| 53 || June 2 || Pirates || 5–1 || Marcum (4–3) || Bédard (3–6) || || 39,603 || 24–29
|-  align"center" bgcolor="ffbbbb"
| 54 || June 3 || Pirates || 5–6 || McDonald (5–2) || Fiers (1–1) || Hanrahan (14) || 34,334 || 24–30
|-  align"center" bgcolor="ffbbbb"
| 55 || June 5 || Cubs || 0–10 || Dempster (1–3) || Gallardo (4–5) || || 28,071 || 24–31
|-  align"center" bgcolor="bbffbb"
| 56 || June 6 || Cubs || 8–0 || Greinke (7–2) || Maholm (4–5) || || 27,112 || 25–31
|-  align"center" bgcolor="bbffbb"
| 57 || June 7 || Cubs || 4–3 (10) || Axford (1–2) || Coleman  (0–1) || || 30,123 || 26–31
|-  align"center" bgcolor="bbffbb"
| 58 || June 8 || Padres || 9–5 || Marcum (5–3) || Vólquez (2–6) || || 32,759 || 27–31
|-  align"center" bgcolor="ffbbbb"
| 59 || June 9 || Padres || 2–5 || Ohlendorf (1–0) || Fiers (1–2) || Street (5) || 41,604 || 27–32
|-  align"center" bgcolor="bbffbb"
| 60 || June 10 || Padres || 6–5 || Gallardo (5–5) || Bass (2–6) || Veras (1) || 43,021 || 28–32
|-  salign"center" bgcolor="ffbbbb"
| 61 || June 12 || @ Royals || 1–2 || Holland (2–2) || Rodríguez (0–4) || Broxton (15) || 24,258 || 28–33
|-  align"center" bgcolor="ffbbbb"
| 62 || June 13 || @ Royals || 3–4 (11) || Collins (3–0) || Loe (2–2) || || 17,885 || 28–34
|-  align"center" bgcolor="ffbbbb"
| 63 || June 14 || @ Royals || 3–4 || Collins (4–0) || Axford (1–3)|| || 21,869 || 28–35
|-  align"center" bgcolor="bbffbb"
| 64 || June 15 || @ Twins || 5–3 || Loe (3–2) || Capps (1–4) || Axford (11) || 37,295 || 29–35
|-  align"center" bgcolor="bbffbb"
| 65 || June 16 || @ Twins || 6–2 || Fiers (2–2) || Hendriks (0–3) || || 37,698 || 30–35
|-  align"center" bgcolor="ffbbbb"
| 66 || June 17 || @ Twins || 4–5 (15) || Swarzak (1–4) || Dillard (0–2) || || 39,206 || 30–36
|-  align"center" bgcolor="bbffbb"
| 67 || June 18 || Blue Jays || 7–6 || Loe (4–2) || Coello (0–1) || Axford (12) || 32,223 || 31–36
|-  align"center" bgcolor="ffbbbb"
| 68 || June 19 || Blue Jays || 9–10 || Oliver (1–2) || Axford (1–4)|| Janssen (7) || 36,334 || 31–37
|-  align"center" bgcolor="bbffbb"
| 69 || June 20 || Blue Jays || 8–3 || Gallardo (6–5) || Carreño (0–2) || || 33,077 || 32–37
|-  align"center" bgcolor="bbffbb"
| 70 || June 22 || @ White Sox || 1–0 (10) || Greinke (8–2) || Crain (1–1) || Axford (13) || 22,798 || 33–37
|-  align"center" bgcolor="ffbbbb"
| 71 || June 23 || @ White Sox || 6–8 || Crain (2–1) || Veras (3–3) || Reed (9) || 30,337 || 33–38
|-  align"center" bgcolor="ffbbbb"
| 72 || June 24 || @ White Sox || 0–1 (10) || Bruney (1–0) || Parra (0–2) || || 26,545 || 33–39
|-  align"center" bgcolor="ffbbbb"
| 73 || June 25 || @ Reds || 1–3 || Latos (6–2) || Gallardo (6–6) || || 34,485 || 33–40
|-  align"center" bgcolor="ffbbbb"
| 74 || June 26 || @ Reds || 3–4 || Marshall (3–4) || Axford (1–5) || Chapman (9) || 32,986 || 33–41
|-  align"center" bgcolor="bbffbb"
| 75 || June 27 || @ Reds || 8–4 || Greinke (9–2) || Bailey (5–6) || || 28,906 || 34–41
|-  align"center" bgcolor="ffbbbb"
| 76 || June 29 || Diamondbacks || 3–9 || Kennedy (6–7) || Wolf (2–6) || || 38,030 || 34–42
|-  align"center" bgcolor="bbffbb"
| 77 || June 30 || Diamondbacks || 10–2 || Fiers (3–2) || Miley (9–4) || || 41,647 || 35–42

|-  align"center" bgcolor="bbffbb"
| 78 || July 1 || Diamondbacks || 2–1 || Axford (2–5) || Corbin (2–4) || || 38,605 || 36–42
|-  align"center" bgcolor="bbffbb"
| 79 || July 2 || Marlins || 6–5 || Rodríguez (1–4) || Webb (3–2) || Axford (14) || 28,674 || 37–42
|-  align"center" bgcolor="bbffbb"
| 80 || July 3 || Marlins || 13–12 (10) || Hernández (2–1) || Bell (2–4) || || 33,178 || 38–42
|-  align"center" bgcolor="ffbbbb"
| 81 || July 4 || Marlins || 6–7 (10) || LeBlanc (1–0) || Parra (0–3) || Bell (18) || 31,910 || 38–43
|-  align"center" bgcolor="ffbbbb"
| 82 || July 5 || Marlins || 0–4 || Buehrle (8–8) || Fiers (3–3) || || 27,443 || 38–44
|-  align"center" bgcolor="bbffbb"
| 83 || July 6 || @ Astros || 7–1 || Gallardo (7–6) || Happ (6–9) || || 23,430 || 39–44
|-  align"center" bgcolor="ffbbbb"
| 84 || July 7 || @ Astros || 3–6 || Rodríguez (7–6) || Greinke (9–3) || Myers (18) || 23,027 || 39–45
|-  align"center" bgcolor="bbffbb"
| 85 || July 8 || @ Astros || 5–3 (10) || Parra (1–3) || Rodriguez (1–8) || Axford (15) || 16,966 || 40–45
|-  align"center" bgcolor="bbffbb"
| 86 || July 13 || Pirates || 10–7 || Rodríguez (2–4) || Watson (4–1) || || 35,025 || 41–45
|-  align"center" bgcolor="ffbbbb"
| 87 || July 14 || Pirates || 4–6 || Correia (6–6) || Loe (4–3) || Hanrahan (24) || 42,029 || 41–46
|-  align"center" bgcolor="bbffbb"
| 88 || July 15 || Pirates || 4–1 || Gallardo (8–6) || Burnett (10–3) || Axford (16) || 35,430 || 42–46
|-  align"center" bgcolor="ffbbbb"
| 89 || July 16 || Cardinals || 2–3 || Motte (4–3) || Axford (2–6) || || 30,128 || 42–47
|-  align"center" bgcolor="bbffbb"
| 90 || July 17 || Cardinals || 3–2 || Wolf (3–6) || Kelly (1–2) || Rodríguez (2) || 30,491 || 43–47
|-  align"center" bgcolor="bbffbb"
| 91 || July 18 || Cardinals || 4–3 || Axford (3–6) || Wainwright (7–10) || Rodríguez (3) || 37,753 || 44–47
|-  align"center" bgcolor="ffbbbb"
| 92 || July 20 || @ Reds || 1–3 || Bailey (9–6) || Estrada (0–4) || Chapman (16) || 30,247 || 44–48
|-  align"center" bgcolor="ffbbbb"
| 93 || July 21 || @ Reds || 2–6 || Arroyo (5–6) || Gallardo (8–7) || || 40,090 || 44–49
|-  align"center" bgcolor="ffbbbb"
| 94 || July 22 || @ Reds || 1–2 || Cueto (12–5) || Fiers (3–4) || Chapman (17) || 32,884 || 44–50
|-  align"center" bgcolor="ffbbbb"
| 95 || July 23 || @ Phillies || 6–7 || Savery (1–2) || Rodríguez (2–5) || || 43,717 || 44–51
|-  align"center" bgcolor="ffbbbb"
| 96 || July 24 || @ Phillies || 6–7 || Schwimer (1–1) || Loe (4–4) || Papelbon (22) || 43,745 || 44–52
|-  align"center" bgcolor="ffbbbb"
| 97 || July 25 || @ Phillies || 6–7 (10) || Schwimer (2–1) || Rodríguez (2–6) || || 44,715 || 44–53
|-  align"center" bgcolor="ffbbbb"
| 98 || July 26 || Nationals || 2–8 || Jackson (6–6) || Gallardo (8–8) || || 33,176 || 44–54
|-  align"center" bgcolor="bbffbb"
| 99 || July 27 || Nationals || 6–0 || Fiers (4–4) || Detwiler (5–4) || || 35,858 || 45–54
|-  align"center" bgcolor="ffbbbb"
| 100 || July 28 || Nationals || 1–4 || Zimmermann (8–6) || Wolf (3–7) || Clippard (19) || 41,890 || 45–55
|-  align"center" bgcolor="ffbbbb"
| 101 || July 29 || Nationals || 10–11 (11) || Stammen (4–1) || Veras (3–4) || Clippard (20) || 44,663 || 45–56
|-  align"center" bgcolor="bbffbb"
| 102 || July 30 || Astros || 8–7 || Hernández (3–1) || Cordero (3–8) || Axford (17) || 28,131 || 46–56
|-  align"center" bgcolor="bbffbb"
| 103 || July 31 || Astros || 10–1 || Gallardo (9–8) || Keuchel (1–4) || || 30,011 || 47–56

|-  align"center" bgcolor="bbffbb"
| 104 || August 1 || Astros || 13–4 || Fiers (5–4) || Lyles (2–8) || || 32,217 || 48–56
|-  align"center" bgcolor="ffbbbb"
| 105 || August 3 || @ Cardinals || 3–9 || Kelly (2–4) || Wolf (3–8) || || 41,505 || 48–57
|-  align"center" bgcolor="ffbbbb"
| 106 || August 4 || @ Cardinals || 1–6 || Wainwright (9–10) || Rogers (0–1) || || 42,036 || 48–58
|-  align"center" bgcolor="ffbbbb"
| 107 || August 5 || @ Cardinals || 0–3 || Lohse (12–2) || Estrada (0–5) || Motte (24) || 40,274 || 48–59
|-  align"center" bgcolor="bbffbb"
| 108 || August 6 || Reds || 6–3 || Gallardo (10–8) || Arroyo (7–7) || Axford (18) || 31,319 || 49–59
|-  align"center" bgcolor="bbffbb"
| 109 || August 7 || Reds || 3–1 || Fiers (6–4) || Cueto (14–6) || Henderson (1) || 41,213 || 50–59
|-  align"center" bgcolor="bbffbb"
| 110 || August 8 || Reds || 3–2 || Axford (4–6) || Broxton (2–3) || Henderson (2) || 33,788 || 51–59
|-  align"center" bgcolor="ffbbbb"
| 111 || August 10 || @ Astros || 3–4 || López (4–1) || Axford (4–7) || || 21,025 || 51–60
|-  align"center" bgcolor="ffbbbb"
| 112 || August 11 || @ Astros || 5–6 (10) || López (5–1)|| Henderson (0–1) || || 17,942 || 51–61
|-  align"center" bgcolor="bbffbb"
| 113 || August 12 || @ Astros || 5–3 || Gallardo (11–8) || Lyles (2–9) || Loe (1) || 19,235 || 52–61
|-  align"center" bgcolor="ffbbbb"
| 114 || August 13 || @ Rockies || 6–9 || Francis (4–4) || Fiers (6–5) || || 26,821 || 52–62
|-  align"center" bgcolor="ffbbbb"
| 115 || August 14 || @ Rockies || 6–8 || Chatwood (3–2) || Wolf (3–9) || Betancourt (21) || 28,036 || 52–63 
|-  align"center" bgcolor="ffbbbb"
| 116 || August 15 || @ Rockies || 6–7 || Harris (1–0) || Henderson (0–2) || || 23,411 || 52–64
|-  align"center" bgcolor="bbffbb"
| 117 || August 16 || Phillies || 7–4 || Hernández (4–1) || Lindblom (2–3) || Henderson (3) || 30,117 || 53–64
|-  align"center" bgcolor="bbffbb"
| 118 || August 17 || Phillies || 6–2 || Gallardo (12–8) || Worley (6–8) || || 39,163 || 54–64
|-  align"center" bgcolor="ffbbbb"
| 119 || August 18 || Phillies || 3–4 || Hamels (14–6) || Fiers (6–6) || Papelbon (27) || 43,386 || 54–65
|-  align"center" bgcolor="ffbbbb"
| 120 || August 19 || Phillies || 0–8 || Kendrick (6–9) || Wolf (3–10) || || 42,224 || 54–66
|-  align"center" bgcolor="bbffbb"
| 121 || August 20 || Cubs || 9–5 || Rogers (1–1) || Germano (2–3) || || 28,776 || 55–66
|-  align"center" bgcolor="bbffbb"
| 122 || August 21 || Cubs || 5–2 || Estrada (1–5) || Rusin (0–1) || Axford (19) || 29,179 || 56–66
|-  align"center" bgcolor="bbffbb"
| 123 || August 22 || Cubs || 3–2 || Gallardo (13–8) || Wood (4–10) || Axford (20) || 30,743 || 57–66
|-  align"center" bgcolor="bbffbb"
| 124 || August 24 || @ Pirates || 6–5 || Fiers (7–6) || Rodríguez (8–13) || Loe (2) || 37,197 || 58–66
|-  align"center" bgcolor="ffbbbb"
| 125 || August 25 || @ Pirates || 0–4 || Karstens (5–3) || Marcum (5–4) || || 37,460 || 58–67
|-  align"center" bgcolor="bbffbb"
| 126 || August 26 || @ Pirates || 7–0 || Rogers (2–1) || Bédard (7–14) || || 36,626 || 59–67
|-  align"center" bgcolor="bbffbb"
| 127 || August 27 || @ Cubs || 15–4 || Estrada (2–5) || Germano (2–4) || || 32,541 || 60–67
|-  align"center" bgcolor="bbffbb"
| 128 || August 28 || @ Cubs || 4–1 || Gallardo (14–8) || Wood (4–11) || Axford (21) || 30,017 || 61–67
|-  align"center" bgcolor="bbffbb"
| 129 || August 29 || @ Cubs || 3–1 || Fiers (8–6) || Samardzija (8–12) || Axford (22) || 33,271 || 62–67
|-  align"center" bgcolor="ffbbbb"
| 130 || August 30 || @ Cubs || 11–12 || Mármol (2–2) || Rodríguez (2–7) || || 28,859 || 62–68
|-  align"center" bgcolor="bbffbb"
| 131 || August 31 || Pirates || 9–3 || Rogers (3–1) || Karstens (5–4) || || 33,877 || 63–68

|-  align"center" bgcolor="bbffbb"
| 132 || September 1 || Pirates || 3–2 || Axford (5–7) || Hanrahan (4–1) || || 32,060 || 64–68
|-  align"center" bgcolor="bbffbb"
| 133 || September 2 || Pirates || 12–8 || Loe (5–4) || McDonald (12–7) || Axford (23) || 32,728 || 65–68
|-  align"center" bgcolor="ffbbbb"
| 134 || September 3 || @ Marlins || 3–7 || Nolasco (11–12) || Fiers (8–7) || Cishek (12) || 22,391 || 65–69
|-  align"center" bgcolor="bbffbb"
| 135 || September 4 || @ Marlins || 8–4 || Loe (6–4) || Dunn (0–2) || Axford (24) || 23,403 || 66–69
|-  align"center" bgcolor="bbffbb"
| 136 || September 5 || @ Marlins || 8–5 || Peralta (1–0) || Eovaldi (4–11) || Axford (25) || 22,288 || 67–69
|-  align"center" bgcolor="ffbbbb"
| 137 || September 6 || @ Marlins || 2–6 || Johnson (8–11) || Estrada (2–6) || || 18,707 || 67–70
|-  align"center" bgcolor="bbffbb"
| 138 || September 7 || @ Cardinals || 5–4 (13) || Kintzler (1–0)|| Lynn (13–7) || Axford (26) || 38,648 || 68–70
|-  align"center" bgcolor="bbffbb"
| 139 || September 8 || @ Cardinals || 6–3 || Fiers (9–7) || Westbrook (13–11) || Axford (27) || 40,422 || 69–70
|-  align"center" bgcolor="ffbbbb"
| 140 || September 9 || @ Cardinals || 4–5 (10)|| Lynn (14–7) || Loe (6–5) || || 39,919 || 69–71
|-  align"center" bgcolor="bbffbb"
| 141 || September 10 || Braves || 4–1 || Veras (4–4) || Venters (5–4) || Axford (28) || 34,395 || 70–71
|-  align"center" bgcolor="bbffbb"
| 142 || September 11 || Braves || 5–0 || Estrada (3–6) || Hudson (14–6) || || 27,382 || 71–71
|-  align"center" bgcolor="bbffbb"
| 143 || September 12 || Braves || 8–2 || Gallardo (15–8) || Maholm (12–10) || || 37,847 || 72–71
|-  align"center" bgcolor="ffbbbb"
| 144 || September 14 || Mets || 3–7 || Niese (11–9) || Fiers (9–8) || || 38,216 || 72–72
|-  align"center" bgcolor="bbffbb"
| 145 || September 15 || Mets || 9–6 || Kintzler (2–0) || Mejía (0–1) || || 38,108 || 73–72
|-  align"center" bgcolor="bbffbb"
| 146 || September 16 || Mets || 3–0 || Peralta (2–0) || Young (4–8) || Axford (29) || 38,677 || 74–72
|-  align"center" bgcolor="bbffbb"
| 147 || September 18 || @ Pirates || 6–0 || Gallardo (16–8) || Burnett (15–8) || || 15,492 || 75–72
|-  align"center" bgcolor="bbffbb"
| 148 || September 19 || @ Pirates || 3–1 || Estrada (4–6) || McPherson (0–1) || Axford (30) || 15,337 || 76–72
|-  align"center" bgcolor="bbffbb"
| 149 || September 20 || @ Pirates || 9–7 || Parra (2–3) || Resop (1–4) || Axford (31) || 14,697 || 77–72
|-  align"center" bgcolor="bbffbb"
| 150 || September 21 || @ Nationals || 4–2 || Veras (5–4) || Clippard (2–6) || Axford (32) || 30,382 || 78–72
|-  align"center" bgcolor="ffbbbb"
| 151 || September 22 || @ Nationals || 4–10 || Gonzalez (20–8) || Peralta (2–1) || || 40,493 || 78–73
|-  align"center" bgcolor="bbffbb"
| 152 || September 23 || @ Nationals || 6–2 || Kintzler (3–0) || Mattheus (5–3) || Axford (33) || 33,111 || 79–73
|-  align"center" bgcolor="ffbbbb"
| 153 || September 24 || @ Nationals || 2–12 || Zimmermann (12–8) || Estrada (4–7) || || 25,302 || 79–74
|-  align"center" bgcolor="ffbbbb"
| 154 || September 25 || @ Reds || 2–4 || Cueto (19–9) || Fiers (9–9) || Chapman (36) || 18,155 || 79–75
|-  align"center" bgcolor="bbffbb"
| 155 || September 26 || @ Reds || 8–1 || Marcum (6–4) || Arroyo (12–9) || || 20,570 || 80–75
|-  align"center" bgcolor="ffbbbb"
| 156 || September 27 || @ Reds || 1–2 || Broxton (4–3) || Axford (5–8) || || 23,411 || 80–76
|-  align"center" bgcolor="ffbbbb"
| 157 || September 28 || Astros || 6–7 || González (3–1) || Gallardo (16–9) || López (9) || 41,716 || 80–77
|-  align"center" bgcolor="bbffbb"
| 158 || September 29 || Astros || 9–5 || Estrada (5–7) || Keuchel (3–8) || || 34,294 || 81–77
|-  align"center" bgcolor="ffbbbb"
| 159 || September 30 || Astros || 0–7 || Lyles (5–12) || Fiers (9–10) || || 38,443 || 81–78

|-  align"center" bgcolor="bbffbb"
| 160 || October 1 || Padres || 5–3 || Marcum (7–4) || Richard (14–14) || Axford (34) || 30,398 || 82–78
|-  align"center" bgcolor="bbffbb"
| 161 || October 2 || Padres || 4–3 || Henderson (1–2) || Bass (2–8) || Axford (35) || 30,714 || 83–78
|-  align"center" bgcolor="ffbbbb"
| 162 || October 3 || Padres || 6–7 || Layne (2–0) || Henderson (1–3) || Gregerson (9) || 34,451 || 83–79

|

Transactions

December 7, 2011: Signed RP Francisco Rodriguez.
December 12, 2011: Signed SS Alex Gonzalez.
December 13, 2011: Traded 3B Casey McGehee to Pirates for RP José Veras.
December 14, 2011: Signed 3B Aramis Ramírez.
January 9, 2012: Signed 3B Brooks Conrad.
January 17, 2012: Signed LF Norichika Aoki.

Farm system

The Brewers' farm system consisted of seven minor league affiliates in 2012. The Wisconsin Timber Rattlers won the Midwest League championship.

References

External links
2012 Milwaukee Brewers season at Baseball Reference
2012 Milwaukee Brewers season Official Site

Milwaukee Brewers seasons
Milwaukee Brewers
Milwaukee Brewers